Gregory B. Jones, Sr. (born May 9, 1981) is a former American football fullback. He was drafted by the Jacksonville Jaguars in the second round of the 2004 NFL Draft and also played for the Houston Texans. He played college football at Florida State.

Early years
Jones attended Battery Creek High School in Beaufort, South Carolina, where he earned all-state honors on offense and defense, and also ran track and field, recording a personal best of 10.7 seconds in the 100 meters.

College career
Initially recruited as an All-State Linebacker, he played for Florida State as a running back. Freshman 00': In the season opener (Week 1) vs. North Carolina (Sep.16), Jones scored his first Collegiate Touchdown as a Seminole. Despite having a strong season it would end early; tore the ACL in is left knee finishing the season playing in 7 games (Missed the last 5).

Professional career

Jacksonville Jaguars
The Jaguars selected Jones in the second round of the 2004 NFL Draft. In Jacksonville, he has mostly seen action as fullback, filling in at tailback and as a substitute for Fred Taylor.

In his rookie season 04', Jones carried 62 times for 162 yards and three touchdowns.

In his second season (05') with the Jacksonville Jaguars, Jones Rushed for 651 yards on 171 Carries & 4 Touchdowns

Due to an injury to his ACL suffered against the Tampa Bay Buccaneers during preseason on August 26, 2006, Jones did not play football during the 2006 NFL season.

During the 2007 NFL season Jones carried the ball 92 times for 319 yards and 5 touchdowns. He also added 99 yards and 2 touchdowns on 11 catches and he was the first alternate on AFC Pro Bowl roster at fullback. He was scheduled to become a free agent but on February 13, 2008, the Jaguars signed him to a new deal. The deal was worth $17.4 million over 5 years, including up to $3 million in incentives. The deal made Jones the highest-paid fullback in NFL history.

Jones was placed on season-ending injured reserve with an ankle injury on December 10, 2008. He finished the 2008 season with 62 carries for 213 yards & 2 Touchdowns and 33 receptions for 316 yard & 3 touchdown in 12 games.

On December 17, 2009, Jones was placed on Injured Reserve due to an ankle injury and missed the rest of the season.

Jones was the fullback when the Jaguars' All-Pro running back Maurice Jones-Drew led the league in rushing yards in 2011.

Houston Texans
Jones was signed by the Houston Texans on March 27, 2013.

New Orleans Saints
Jones signed with the New Orleans Saints on August 6, 2014.

He was notified of his release on August 29, 2014, as part of the team's roster cutdown.

Retirement
On January 14, 2015, he announced his retirement as a member of the Jaguars. He officially retired while under a one-day contract to the Jacksonville Jaguars on January 15, 2015.

NFL statistics
Rushing 

Receiving

Returning

Personal life
Jones is a cousin of boxer Joe Frazier.

References

External links

1981 births
Living people
Players of American football from Columbia, South Carolina
American football fullbacks
Florida State Seminoles football players
Jacksonville Jaguars players
Houston Texans players
New Orleans Saints players
Ed Block Courage Award recipients